Polyachyrus is a genus of South American plants in the family Asteraceae.

Species accepted by the Plants of the World Online as of December 2022:

References

Nassauvieae
Asteraceae genera
Flora of Bolivia
Flora of Chile
Flora of Peru
Taxa named by Mariano Lagasca